J'Neil Lloyd Bennett (born 7 December 2001) is an English professional footballer who plays as a left winger for  club Brentford. He is a product of the Tottenham Hotspur Academy and was capped by England at U18 level.

Early life 
Bennett was born in London and grew up in Camden. He attended Haverstock School.

Club career

Tottenham Hotspur 
A left winger, Bennett began his career in the Queens Park Rangers Academy and moved into the Tottenham Hotspur Academy in 2017. He progressed into the U18 team during the 2017–18 season and signed a scholarship deal at the end of the campaign. Bennett had a breakout 2018–19 season, in which he made U17, U18, U19 and Development Squad appearances. His 2018 Euro Youth Cup performances for the U17 team saw him named as the Player of the Tournament and late in the season, he scored the first goal at the new Tottenham Hotspur Stadium during a test event.

Bennett progressed into the Development Squad and signed his first professional contract on New Year's Eve 2019. On 19 August 2021, he received his maiden call into a first team matchday squad and made his professional debut as a substitute for Ryan Sessegnon after 81 minutes of a 1–0 UEFA Europa Conference League playoff round first leg defeat to Paços de Ferreira.

Bennett joined League One club Crewe Alexandra on trial during the 2021–22 pre-season and he joined the club on a half-season loan on 31 August 2021. On his second competitive appearance for the Railwaymen, Bennett's first-half cross forced an own goal and he later broke away to score his first professional goal in a 2–0 victory over Burton Albion. In November 2021, an ankle ligament injury saw Bennett return to Tottenham Hotspur for treatment and rehabilitation and the loan expired before his return to fitness. He made 11 appearances and scored one goal during his spell at Gresty Road. After returning to fitness, Bennett played the rest of the 2021–22 season for the Tottenham Hotspur Development Squad and was released when his contract expired in June 2022.

Brentford 
Early in the 2022–23 season, Bennett joined the B team at Premier League club Brentford on trial, which was interrupted due to a back injury. After returning to fitness, he signed a one-year contract, with the option of a further year, on 30 November 2022.

International career 
Bennett won five caps and scored one goal for England at U18 level during the 2018–19 season.

Career statistics

Honours 

 Euro Youth Cup Player of the Tournament: 2018

References

External links
J'Neil Bennett at brentfordfc.com

2001 births
Living people
English footballers
England youth international footballers
Footballers from Greater London
Tottenham Hotspur F.C. players
Crewe Alexandra F.C. players
Black British sportspeople
English Football League players
Brentford F.C. players
People from Camden Town
Association football wingers